The Broadway Gallant is a 1926 American action film directed by Noel M. Smith and written by Frank Howard Clark. The film stars Richard Talmadge, Clara Horton, Joseph Harrington Jack Richardson, Cecile Cameron and Ford West. The film was released on April 25, 1926, by Film Booking Offices of America.

Cast          
Richard Talmadge as Monty Barnes
Clara Horton as Helen Stuart
Joseph Harrington as Jake Peasley 
Jack Richardson as Red Sweeney
Cecile Cameron as Rita Delroy
Ford West as Hiram Weatherby

References

External links
 

1926 films
1920s English-language films
American action films
1920s action films
Film Booking Offices of America films
Films directed by Noel M. Smith
American silent feature films
American black-and-white films
Silent action films
1920s American films